The 1974 Michigan State Spartans football team was an American football team that represented Michigan State University in the 1974 Big Ten Conference football season. In their second season under head coach Denny Stolz, the Spartans compiled a 7–3–1 record, finished in third place in the Big Ten, and were ranked No. 12 in the final AP Poll. Quarterback Charlie Baggett was selected as the team's most valuable player.

Schedule

Roster

Game summaries

Michigan

    
    
    
    

On October 12, 1974, Michigan State lost to Michigan by a 21-7 score. The game, played at Michigan Stadium, attracted a crowd of 104,682, reported to be "the second largest crowd in modern N.C.A.A. history" behind the 1973 Michigan-Ohio State game. Gordon Bell led Michigan's rushing attack with 73 yards on 16 carries, including a 13-yard touchdown run in the first quarter. Dennis Franklin completed five of nine passes for 84 yards, including a 45-yard touchdown pass to Jim Smith in the second quarter, but left the game in the third quarter with bruised ribs.  Linebacker Dan Jilek also scored in the second quarter when he forced a fumble on a punt attempt and then recovered it in the end zone.

Ohio State
Michigan State manages a considerable upset at home, topping then #1 Ohio State, 16-13. Fullback Levi Jackson scores the final points of the game on an 88-yard TD run, followed by a Hans Neilsen point after touchdown. In a tumultuous finish, Ohio State fails to convert at the Spartans' 1-yard line as time expires. Big Ten Commissioner Wayne Duke went to referee Gene Calhoun and the team of officials to confirm that the Buckeyes had not attempted their second-down play before the clock ran out.

See also
 1974 in Michigan

References

Michigan State
Michigan State Spartans football seasons
Michigan State Spartans football